Gamonedaspis is a trilobite in the order Phacopida (family Dalmanitidae), that existed during the lower Devonian in what is now Bolivia. It was described by Branisa and Vanek in 1973, and the type species is Gamonedaspis scutata. The type locality was the Belén Formation.

References

External links
 Gamonedaspis at the Paleobiology Database

Dalmanitidae
Fossil taxa described in 1973
Devonian trilobites of South America